Verkhneye Maryino is a rural locality (a selo) and the administrative center of Starinskoye Rural Settlement, Kashirsky District, Voronezh Oblast, Russia. The population was 108 as of 2010.

Geography 
Verkhneye Maryino is located 23 km southwest of Kashirskoye (the district's administrative centre) by road. Dankovo is the nearest rural locality.

References 

Rural localities in Kashirsky District, Voronezh Oblast